Crestview is a city in Okaloosa County, Florida, United States. The population was 27,134 at the 2020 census, up from 20,978 at the 2010 census. It is the county seat of Okaloosa County.

Crestview is a principal city of the  Fort Walton Beach-Crestview-Destin Metropolitan Statistical Area.

Etymology and nicknames
Crestview's name was chosen because of its location on the peak of a long woodland range between the Yellow and Shoal rivers which flow almost parallel on the east and west side of the city.

The town was once known as "the icebox of Florida", due to its having the coldest winters in the state. Crestview is now known as the "Hub City", because of the convergence of Interstate 10, State Road 85, U.S. Highway 90, the Florida Gulf & Atlantic Railroad, and the Yellow River and Shoal River in or near the city.

History
Crestview was largely an outgrowth of the coming of railroad service to the west Panhandle of Florida.

The Pensacola and Atlantic Railroad Company, chartered in 1881, opened its line between Pensacola and Chattahoochee in January 1883. Soon two express passenger trains, the Atlantic Express and the Gulf Express, and a local accommodation train that stopped everywhere, were in daily operation. The expresses took about six hours to make the run, the local, thirteen hours. When the railroad company was unable to cover the interest owed bondholders, the Louisville and Nashville Railroad covered the shortfalls until 1885, and then foreclosed, merging the route into their system as the L & N's Pensacola and Atlantic Division.

In 1894, sawmill operator W. B. Wright opened the  Yellow River Railroad between Crestview and Florala, Alabama via Auburn, Campton, and Laurel Hill. The L & N supplied the line with freight cars, and in 1906, purchased the operation, as the Yellow River Branch. This line, without any major shippers on it to make it profitable, was used for freight car storage for a time in the early 1980s and then was abandoned with 25.3 miles of the route lifted after May 1985, although the right of way still exists, with some portions paved as local streets.

The 1920 Census figures for the City of Crestview, precinct 15 was 938.

On July 23, 1920, Crestview hosted the first public hanging for Okaloosa County. Robert Blackwell was convicted of killing Nancy and Bud Davis in 1917, and received the death penalty. One week prior to the date of his hanging, Blackwell confessed, and his confession was printed in area newspapers on his hanging day. The second and last Okaloosa County hangings took place in Crestview, Florida on September 23, 1921. Thousands of curious onlookers came from surrounding states. Putnam Ponsell and Jacob Benjamin Marin were publicly hanged for killing John F. Tuggle. This double hanging in 1921 was the last public hanging in Florida.

Smith-Johnson Company, Inc. opened a garment factory in Crestview in 1937 that utilized 250 machines and employed "around 300 persons".

A modern bus terminal served by the Greyhound Lines' Jacksonville-Los Angeles route, as well as connections north to Atlanta, Memphis and New York, featuring waiting rooms, lounge, smoking rooms, restaurant, and loading concourse, opened on the corner of Ferdon and Pearl Streets on Friday 9 May 1941. As per the standards of the era, it was segregated.

As nearby Eglin Field was expanded into a major testing base, the Louisville and Nashville Railroad laid a long sidetrack in  Crestview in the spring of 1941 to handle the number of oil tankcars required to supply the Asphault Products Company with material for the vast paving job of the ten new airfields. A fleet of trucks were operated round the clock to offload an estimated 180 car loads of petroleum product for the task.

A recreation center for enlisted men at the expanding Eglin Field was opened in Crestview on Saturday, June 21, 1941, through the efforts of the Community Recreation Council, the Works Progress Administration, and the Okaloosa Progressive Association.

In late January 1943, a "misunderstanding" by the constabulary of Crestview put the community off limits to military personnel from Eglin Field. The Pensacola News Journal reported on 31 January that the town was off the "black list." According to the front-page report, "The out-of-town bounds restrictions that had been imposed on Crestview by Eglin field  authorities were lifted at noon today [30 January], after a conference of town officials and Eglin authorities, and it was stated that soldiers from the field may visit the town. Billy Powell, town marshal, whose arrest of a soldier for reckless driving and an Eglin officer for interference, precipitated the trouble during the week, has been suspended by the town council. Powell was himself put in the county jail by an MP detachment from Eglin field and stayed there until his attorney, John M. Coe, Pensacola, released him through circuit court action." The servicemen involved had taken a convoy of newly trained Aviation Engineering Battalion personnel to load on a train at Crestview when the over-zealous marshal tried to arrest a black jeep driver for a U-turn, thus leading to the unpleasantness. After Eglin Commanding Officer Brigadier General Grandison Gardner explained the economics of wartime to the city fathers, they chose a more reasonable replacement for town marshal.

On July 31, 1949, the L&N inaugurated the Gulf Wind streamliner through Crestview between New Orleans and Jacksonville, in conjunction with the Seaboard Air Line Railroad, replacing the heavyweight New Orleans-Florida Limited. It operated until April 30, 1971, when Amtrak took over most U.S. rail passenger service and discontinued this route.

In the 1960s, Crestview was the location for the studio of the Apache Records label.

As part of the 2005 Base Realignment and Closure round, Crestview experienced further population growth as the U.S. Army's 7th Special Forces Group relocated from Fort Bragg, North Carolina to a newly built cantonment facility on the northern end of the Eglin Air Force Base reservation, approximately six miles south of the city.

In 2007, George Whitehurst, who had been mayor for nearly 20 years, resigned, leading to the election of David Cadle. Cadle had retired in 2006 as the long-time director of the Crestview High School band, The Big Red Machine. Cadle was replaced in 2019 by a retired member of the US Air Force, former high school teacher and city council member, JB Whitten, as the city switched to a council-manager form of government.

In September 2022, two planes owned by Vertol, a Destin, Florida corporation with ties to congressman Matt Gaetz and Governor Ron DeSantis transported 50 Venezuelan asylum seekers from San Antonio, Texas to Crestview airport, en route to Martha's Vineyard, Massachusetts. The passengers did not disembark from the planes. DeSantis had received an appropriation of $12 million to transport migrants out of the state, funding under the purview of attorney Larry Keefe, DeSantis' public safety czar, who was in charge of immigrant affairs. Vertol was paid $615,000 on September 8 for the transport, and received another $980,000 less than two weeks later. The immigrants had been solicited by a recent U.S. Army retiree, Perla Huerta, to travel to Massachusetts where those so recruited had been misled to believe they would receive English lessons, funds, legal services, jobs and housing at their destination. Notification had not been given to the destination community regarding their impending arrival and needs.

Education
For most of its history, education was provided only for white children. Crestview School, the first school for African-Americans in Crestview, was built in 1926. In 1944, a city block was purchased for a new high school for black students. In 1945, Crestview Colored High School was built on School Avenue. Later, it was renamed after George Washington Carver, and eventually was renamed Carver-Hill School in honor of the efforts of Ed Hill. After integration in 1966, high school students were transferred to the previously all-white Crestview High School and Carver-Hill was utilized for younger students until 1982, when it was converted to administrative use.

Library 
The Crestview Robert L. F. Sikes Public Library was first started as a small library operating out of the home of Crestview resident Bertha Henry in the 1940s, renting out books from hers and her mother's personal collections. The library was moved into the Episcopal Church, as endowed to Henry by her mother, Lucy, and for whom the library was named. It was later moved to a house on West Highway 90. After the library was taken over by the Women's Club of Crestview, it again moved to an apartment and then a shopping mall. In 1976, a building was constructed specifically to host the library, and was renamed to honer Congressman Robert "Bob" Sikes. In 1993, the building was sold by the City of Crestview to the Okaloosa Walton Community College, now Northwest Florida State College. The library remained a part of the building until a new building was constructed. The current library was opened in 2002, and is located at 1445 Commerce Drive. The library is recognized by the Florida Department of State, Division of Library and Information Sciences. The library is a part of the Okaloosa County Public Library Cooperative (OCPLC) consisting of six libraries which share materials through a courier system. Membership at any of these libraries includes membership in the entire Cooperative. Membership to the Robert L. F. Sikes Public Library may be granted to patrons age 5 and up who own or rent property in Okaloosa County at no charge. Membership may also be purchased at an annual fee of $35 per family.

Geography

Topography
Crestview is a very hilly to flat area in the central panhandle   also it is located halfway between Destin and Pensacola 

Climate
Crestview's climate is officially described as humid subtropical (Köppen Cfa). Lows in summer average in the high 60s to low 70s, with each year seeing a handful of 100 °F+ days.

Winters compare to those of interior Alabama, Mississippi, and Georgia. Highs average in the lower to mid 60s (16°-19 °C), and lows average upper 30s (almost 4 °C). Snowfall occurs every three years on average, however, significant amounts only happen once every 10 years.

Vegetation here consists of typical Floridian vegetation as well as several deciduous species from further north. Some palm trees are found here, although only cold-hardy varieties like the state tree, the Sabal palmetto, as well as types of dogwood, maple, hickory, and sweet gum. Blueberries are a native crop raised for sale locally, in addition to Strawberries.  In 1919, M.A. Sapp reported shipping his blueberries from May 10 until the end of August, netting $605.85 for his crop, in addition to that which he shared with friends and family. Fall foliage can be seen in November and December, and Spring blossoms occur from early March through May. Summer typically lasts from late April to early October, and winter lasts from mid-December through mid-February.

Demographics

As of the census of 2000, there were 14,766 people, 5,297 households, and 3,893 families residing in the city. The racial makeup of the city was 74.71% White, 18.41% African American, 0.60% Native American, 2.28% Asian, 0.15% Pacific Islander, 1.22% from other races, and 2.62% from two or more races. Hispanic or Latino of any race were 3.26% of the population. The population estimate for 2005 was 17,707 people.

There were 5,297 households, out of which 40.9% had children under the age of 18 living with them, 53.5% were married couples living together, 16.2% had a female householder with no husband present, and 26.5% were non-families. 22.7% of all households were made up of individuals, and 8.3% had someone living alone who was 65 years of age or older. The average household size was 2.65 and the average family size was 3.09.

In the city, the population was spread out, with 29.2% under the age of 18, 8.9% from 18 to 24, 32.5% from 25 to 44, 17.8% from 45 to 64, and 11.5% who were 65 years of age or older. The median age was 33 years. For every 100 females, there were 93.4 males. For every 100 females age 18 and over, there were 91.5 males.

The median income for a household in the city was $23,122, and the median income for a family was $31,824. Males had a median income of $27,829 versus $19,261 for females. The per capita income for the city was $14,479. About 45.2% of families and 59.7% of the population were below the poverty line, including 56.2% of those under age 18 and 30.4% of those age 65 or over.

Transportation
It was established in 1941 as the CAA Airport.

Major highways through Crestview are U.S. Route 90 heading east–west and Florida State Road 85 heading north–south, intersecting each other north of I-10, which also runs through Crestview. U.S. Route 90 leads east  to DeFuniak Springs and west  to Milton. FL-85 leads northeast  to Florala, Alabama and south  to Niceville. I-10 provides access to the city from exit 56 (FL-85) and leads east  to Tallahassee, the state capital, and southwest  to Pensacola.

From early 1994 through August 2005 Crestview was served by the tri-weekly Amtrak Sunset Limited, but service east of New Orleans to Jacksonville and Orlando was suspended due to damage to the rail line of CSX by Hurricane Katrina in 2005.  This was previously the route of the Gulf Wind streamlined passenger train, operated by the Louisville and Nashville Railroad.

On June 1, 2019, the Florida Gulf & Atlantic Railroad, headquartered in Tallahassee, acquired the CSX main line from Pensacola to Baldwin, near Jacksonville.

Sister city
  Noirmoutier-en-l'Île, France

References

External links

 
 Main Street Crestview Association/ Downtown Crestview
 Crestview Area Chamber of Commerce
 Northwest Florida Daily News
 American Legion Post 75
 North Okaloosa Amateur Radio Club (NOARC)
 Crestview Community Television (CCTV)
 Crestview News-Bulletin

Cities in Okaloosa County, Florida
County seats in Florida
Populated places established in 1883
Cities in Florida
1883 establishments in Florida